The 2025 U Sports Women's Final 8 Basketball Tournament is scheduled to be held March 13–16, 2025, in Vancouver, British Columbia, to determine a national champion for the 2024–25 U Sports women's basketball season.

Host
The tournament is scheduled to be hosted by the University of British Columbia at the school's Doug Mitchell Thunderbird Sports Centre and UBC War Memorial Gymnasium. It will also be held concurrently with the 2025 U Sports Men's Basketball Championship, hence the necessity for two venues, which is also the first time in U Sports history that both tournaments were hosted by one school in the same year. This will be the first time that UBC has hosted the tournament.

Scheduled teams
Canada West Representative
OUA Representative
RSEQ Representative
AUS Representative
Host (UBC Thunderbirds)
Three additional berths

References

External links
 Tournament Web Site

U Sports Women's Basketball Championship
2024–25 in Canadian basketball
2025 in women's basketball
University of British Columbia
Basketball in British Columbia